Events from the year 1263 in Ireland.

Incumbent
Lord: Henry III

Events

Earldom of Ulster, long vacant, is bestowed on Walter de Burgh, Lord of Connacht.

Births

Deaths

References

 
1260s in Ireland
Ireland
Years of the 13th century in Ireland